Byron Black and Donald Johnson were the defending champions but only Johnson competed that year with Gustavo Kuerten.

Johnson and Kuerten won in the final 6–3, 7–6(7–5) against David Adams and Martín García.

Seeds

  David Adams /  Martín García (final)
  Lucas Arnold /  Tomás Carbonell (first round)
  Pablo Albano /  Jaime Oncins (quarterfinals)
  Gastón Etlis /  Martín Rodríguez (semifinals)

Draw

Qualifying

Seeds

Qualifiers
  Mark Merklein /  Mitch Sprengelmeyer

Qualifying draw

External links
 2001 Abierto Mexicano Pegaso Men's Doubles Draw (ITF)
 2001 Abierto Mexicano Pegaso Men's Doubles Draw (ATP)
 Main Draw Archive (ATP)
 Qualifying Draw Archive (ATP)

2001 Abierto Mexicano Pegaso
Doubles